Agelasta mima is a species of beetle in the family Cerambycidae. It was described by James Thomson in 1868. It is known from Borneo and Malaysia.

References

mima
Beetles described in 1868